The 1994–95 Czech Cup was the second season of the annual football knock-out tournament of the Czech Republic. Winners Hradec Králové qualified for the 1995–96 UEFA Cup Winners' Cup.

Preliminary round

Round 1

Round 2

Round 3

Round 4

|}

Quarterfinals
The quarterfinals were played on 19 April 1995.

|}

Semifinals
The semifinals were played on 17 May 1995.

|}

Final

See also
 1994–95 Czech First League
 1994–95 Czech 2. Liga

References

External links
 Official site 
 Czech Cup 1994/95 at RSSSF.com

1994–95
1994–95 domestic association football cups
Cup